Internet police is a generic term  for police and government agencies, departments and other organizations in charge of policing Internet in a number of countries. The major purposes of Internet police, depending on the state, are fighting cybercrime, as well as censorship and propaganda.

Canada 

Several attempts have been made to introduce tools that would allow law enforcement and security agencies to eavesdrop online communications without a warrant, the latest of which was bill C-30, tabled in February 2012 which was abandoned because of strong public opposition.

Estonia
The Computer Emergency Response Team of Estonia (CERT Estonia), established in 2006, is an organization responsible for the management of security incidents in .ee computer networks. Its task is to assist Estonian Internet users in the implementation of preventive measures in order to reduce possible damage from security incidents and to help them in responding to security threats. CERT Estonia deals with security incidents that occur in Estonian networks, are started there, or have been notified of by citizens or institutions either in Estonia or abroad.

India
Cyber Crime Investigation Cell is a wing of Mumbai Police, India, to deal with computer crimes, and to enforce provisions of India's Information Technology Law, namely, The Information Technology Act, 2000, and various cyber crime related provisions of criminal laws, including the Indian Penal Code, and the Companies Act of India subsection on IT-Sector responsibilities of corporate measures to protect cybersecurity. Cyber Crime Investigation Cell is a part of Crime Branch, Criminal Investigation Department of the Mumbai Police.

Andhra Pradesh Cyber Crime Investigation Cell is a wing of Hyderabad Police, India, to deal with Cyber crimes.

Indian Computer Emergency Response Team (CERT-In) also deals with Cyber Security.
"Cyber Police", the Hi-Tech Crime Enquire Cell of the Kerala Police.

Japan

In March 2022, Japan enacted on Wednesday legislation establishing a internet police bureau and a special investigative team at the National Police Agency tasked with tackling serious cybercrime cases.

Netherlands
Dutch police were reported to have set up an Internet Brigade to fight cybercrime. It will be allowed to infiltrate Internet newsgroups and discussion forums for intelligence gathering, to make pseudo-purchase and to provide services.

People's Republic of China

It has been reported that in 2005, departments of provincial and municipal governments in mainland China began creating teams of Internet commentators from propaganda and police departments and offering them classes in Marxism, propaganda techniques, and the Internet. They are reported to guide discussion on public bulletin boards away from politically sensitive topics by posting opinions anonymously or under false names.

Chinese Internet police also erase anti-communist comments and posts pro-government messages. Chinese Communist Party leader Hu Jintao has declared the party's intent to strengthen administration of the online environment and maintain the initiative in online opinion.

Thailand

After the 2006 coup in Thailand, the Thai police has been active in monitoring and silencing dissidents online. Censorship of the Internet is carried out by the Ministry of Information and Communications Technology of Thailand and the Royal Thai Police, in collaboration with the Communications Authority of Thailand and the Telecommunication Authority of Thailand.

On 29 April 2010, Wipas Raksakulthai was arrested on charges of lèse majesté following a post to his Facebook account criticizing King Bhumibol. In May 2011, Amnesty International named him a "prisoner of conscience."

United Kingdom
The Internet Watch Foundation (IWF) is the only recognised organisation in the United Kingdom operating an Internet 'Hotline' for the public and IT professionals to report their exposure to potentially illegal content online. It works in partnership with the police, Government, the public, Internet service providers and the wider online industry.

United States

See also
Internet surveillance
Internet service provider
Use of social network websites in investigations

References

External links
Cybercrime.gov  US Department of Justice CCIPS
Cybercellmumbai.com Indian Cyber Crime Investigation Cell
US CERT United States Computer Emergency Readiness Team (US-CERT)
US Secret Service Computer Fraud
On Guard OnGuardOnline.gov provides practical tips from the federal government and the technology industry to help you be on guard against Internet fraud, secure your computer, and protect your personal information.
RCMP Computer Crime Prevention Royal Canadian Mounted Police
CERT Estonia The Computer Emergency Response Team of Estonia
Tallahassee Internet Police

Computer security organizations
Internet censorship